This is a list of members of the Victorian Legislative Council between 1967 and 1970. As half of the Legislative Council's terms expired at each triennial election, half of these members were elected at the 1964 state election with terms expiring in 1970, while the other half were elected at the 1967 state election with terms expiring in 1973.

A redistribution in 1965 saw Southern Province abolished and Boronia and Templestowe created in its place. The redistribution was carried out in a staggered manner so that in this term, there was one MLC for each of the abolished and new provinces, with the redistribution becoming complete at the 1970 election.

 On 12 February 1968, Ronald Mack, Liberal MLC for Western Province, died. Country candidate Clive Mitchell won the resulting by-election on 6 April 1968.
 In September 1969, Sir Percy Byrnes, Country MLC for North Western, resigned. Country candidate Bernie Dunn won the resulting by-election on 15 November 1969.
 In May 1970, Lindsay Thompson resigned to contest the seat of Malvern in the Legislative Assembly. A by-election was held concurrently with the 1970 state election, which was won by Liberal candidate Charles Hider.

Sources
 Re-member (a database of all Victorian MPs since 1851). Parliament of Victoria.

Members of the Parliament of Victoria by term
20th-century Australian politicians